Geraldo Matsimbe (born 22 October 1992) is a Mozambican professional footballer who plays for Portuguese club Amora FC on loan from Maputo as a midfielder.

Club career
Born in Maputo, Mexer began his career with Liga Desportiva de Maputo. He joined Braga B on loan in 2015, and eventually transferred to Nacional.

Matsimbe made his debut for Nacional in a 2-1 win over Belenenses on 10 September 2016.

International career
Matsimbe made his debut for Mozambique in November 2016, in a friendly 1-0 loss to Kenya.

References

External links

1992 births
Living people
Sportspeople from Maputo
Mozambican footballers
Mozambique international footballers
Association football midfielders
Primeira Liga players
Liga Desportiva de Maputo players
C.D. Nacional players
AD Fafe players
Amora F.C. players
Liga Portugal 2 players
Mozambican expatriate footballers
Expatriate footballers in Portugal
Mozambican expatriate sportspeople in Portugal